Larry Gorman (born May 9, 1972, in Astoria, Queens) is a rock drummer.

Gorman has played in numerous hardcore punk, post-hardcore, and alternative rock bands, including Reach Out, voice, Direct, Fountainhead, Orange 9mm, A Day for Honey, Glassjaw, Head Automatica, Freshkills, and Beyond.

He was also the drummer for New York City dream pop band Asobi Seksu from 2009 until their end in 2013. Asobi Seksu played their final show opening for Slowdive on October 26, 2014.

References 

American rock drummers
People from Queens, New York
1972 births
Living people
20th-century American drummers
American male drummers
21st-century American drummers
20th-century American male musicians
21st-century American male musicians
Glassjaw members
Head Automatica members